Lowther Lodge is a house in South Kensington, London, England, immediately south of Hyde Park, which has housed the Royal Geographical Society since 1912.

History
Lowther Lodge was designed by Richard Norman Shaw and built between approximately 1872 and 1875. The client was William Lowther, an MP who was a nephew of the Earl of Lonsdale, the head of the Lowther landowning family of Westmorland and Cumberland. 

After Lowther died in 1912, his son sold the house to the Royal Geographical Society. The Society converted the building into its headquarters and commissioned extensions, including the Society's lecture theatre, from G. L. Kennedy and F. B. Nightingale in 1928 to 1930. A further extension, including a new exhibition space, reading room and storage area for the Society's collections, was completed in 2004.

Architecture
The building is an important example of Victorian Queen Anne architecture, with gothic influences. The building is also notable for having one of the first passenger lifts in a private house. It is a Grade II* listed building.

See also
 Richard Norman Shaw
 William Lowther
 Royal Geographical Society

References

External links
Survey of London entry (one quarter of the way down the page)
History of Lowther Lodge (pdf file from Royal Geographical Society website)
Albertopolis: Lowther Lodge Architecture and history of the building

1872 establishments in England

Residential buildings completed in 1875

Grade II* listed buildings in the Royal Borough of Kensington and Chelsea
Grade II* listed houses in London
Houses in the Royal Borough of Kensington and Chelsea
Richard Norman Shaw buildings
Royal Geographical Society